The Tshopo River is a river in the Democratic Republic of the Congo. It flows through the north of the city of Kisangani and joins the Lindi River just before that river enters the Congo River. It gives its name to the province of Tshopo.

Basin

It is elongated, and almost entirely north of the equator.
The great falls near the river mouth vary in height from  depending on the height of the Congo River. 

The location in the continental interior by the equator with two rainy seasons and two dry seasons, and the vegetation covering the basin, result in a fairly constant flow.
There are low waters in February–April and in June–August, and high waters in April–May and particularly in October–December.

Ecology

The Lindi and Tshopo rivers form one of the three major right-bank river systems in the Cuvette Centrale, or central Congo Basin, the others being the Itimbiri River and Aruwimi River.
According to a 2015 report, 184 species of fish had been found in the Lindi/Tshopo basin. The family of the elephant fish, Mormyridae, was richest in species.
The river has clear water, compared to the turbid water of the Congo, making it habitable to plant species such as Inversodicraea.

Schistosomiasis is a chronic parasitic disease transmitted by a freshwater mollusc.
A 2018 study of people living in a camp on the banks of the Tshopo river  from Kisangani on the old Buta road found 54.5% positive for Schistosoma haematobium and 7.3% positive for Schistosoma mansoni.
This compared to 2.4% and 4.8% positive rates for people in a nearby village.

Hydroelectric plant

A hydroelectric power plant was built at the Tshopo River Falls to the north of Kisangani in the 1950s, causing the local extinction of Inversodicraea congolana at one of the two sites in the world where it was found.
It was a run-of-the-river plant, so did not require a large reservoir.
The river passes through the hydroelectric dam and then over a waterfall.
In 2013 Belgium's Minister for Cooperation and Development Jean-Pascal Labille and the Orientale Province governor Jean Bamanisa reopened the Tshopo hydroelectric facility after it had been closed for rehabilitation.

A truss bridge was built over the fall in 1968, providing a route for farmers from the northeast to access the city.
It fell into disrepair, and in 2014 was replaced by a  steel panel bridge with a single lane that could carry vehicles up to 41 tons.
It had two external pedestrian walkways.

Citations

Sources

Tributaries of the Congo River